Goulding Chemicals Ltd is a wholly owned subsidiary of Origin Enterprises plc. The company supplies a wide range of Agricultural Fertilisers and Industrial Chemicals to the Irish market.

History
The company has been operating since 1856. It was run for decades by the Goulding family that included Valerie Goulding.

Goulding Fertilisers 
Goulding Fertilisers manufacture and distribute NPK and trace element fertilisers in Ireland. The company supplies mainline and customised blended products to suit local nutrient requirements.

Goulding Chemicals 
Goulding Chemicals supplies a range of concentrations of sodium hydroxide and potassium hydroxide and has the largest storage capacity in Ireland for sulfuric, hydrochloric and nitric acids. The company is registered to ISO 9002 and has received IBEC Accreditation to Responsible Care.

See also 
 Aryzta
 R&H Hall

External links
 Goulding Chemicals

Chemical companies of Ireland